On the Sunny Side is a 1933 Czech drama film by the director Vladislav Vančura. The film is a social drama dealing with the themes of children poverty and neglect.

Plot
Babula is growing up in a rich family, but she's neglected by her parents. She's friends with a son of her family's maid, Honza. When Honza and his mother are thrown out by Babula's father, the two children perform on the streets to earn money. They get arrested and Honza is sent to a children's home 'On the Sunny Side'. Babula's mother tries to commit suicide and Alžběta is sent to the same place. In the children's home their lives get better under the influence of their progressive teacher.

Cast
 Václav Vydra as Josef Rezek
 Zdeňka Gräfová as Rezek's wife
 Babula Treybalová as Alžběta "Babula" Rezková
 Magda Kopřivová as Maid Anežka Kolbenová
 Petr Schulhoff as Honza, son of Anežka
 Jindřich Plachta as Teacher
 Čeněk Šlégl as Counsellor
 Růžena Šlemrová as Children's home director
 Ludvík Veverka as Seidl
 Hana Beckmannová as Insurance company agent Willi

Production
Vančura was a Marxist and his ideas for the movie were influenced by a Russian educator Anton Makarenko. The screenplay was written by an avantgarde writer Vítězslav Nezval, a literary theorist Roman Jakobson and a pedagogue Miloslav Disman. The film was shot in the streets of Prague. The children's home scenes were shot at Zbraslav Monastery.

Release
The premiere was held in Prague on 1 December 1933. The film was received negatively by film critics. The reviews mentioned amateurish direction and technical qualities of the movie. In 2017 the film was screened at MoMA as a part of Czech cinema retrospective 'Ecstasy and Irony: Czech
Cinema, 1927–1943'.

References

External links
 

1933 films
Czech drama films
Czechoslovak drama films
Czech black-and-white films
1933 drama films
1930s Czech-language films